Valnesvatnet is a lake that lies in the municipality of Bodø in Nordland county, Norway. The water in the lake flows out over the Valnesfossen waterfall on its way to the sea.

See also
 List of lakes in Norway
 Geography of Norway

References

Lakes of Nordland
Bodø